Drunella spinifera is a species of spiny crawler mayfly in the family Ephemerellidae. It is found in southwestern and northern Canada and the western United States and Alaska.

References

Further reading

 
 
 
 
 
 
 

Mayflies